Bloodwort or Sanguinaria canadensis is a flowering plant native to eastern North America.

Bloodwort may also refer to:

 Achillea millefolium or common yarrow, a flowering plant species native to the Northern Hemisphere and introduced in New Zealand and Australia
 Haemodoraceae or bloodwort family, a family of flowering plants found primarily in the Southern Hemisphere
 Sanguisorba or burnet, a genus of flowering plants native to temperate regions in the Northern Hemisphere

See also
 Redroot (disambiguation)